Juan Carlos Pérez López (born 30 March 1990), known as Juan Carlos or Juankar, is a Spanish professional footballer who plays for Greek club Panathinaikos F.C. mainly as a left-back but occasionally as a left winger.

He was known as El Galgo de Boadilla (Greyhound of Boadilla) for his runs and speed.

Club career
Born in Madrid, Juan Carlos started his football career at the EFMO Boadilla academy, spending 11 years there from the age of six. In 2007, Real Madrid signed him to their youth system.

After two years, Juan Carlos was promoted to Real Madrid Castilla, going on to spend two full Segunda División B seasons with them. His first goal with the reserves came on 8 November 2009, in a 4–2 home win against Gimnástica de Torrelavega. On 28 September 2010, he was called up for a UEFA Champions League group stage match at AJ Auxerre, but eventually did not leave the bench in the 1–0 victory.

On 3 October 2010, Juan Carlos finally made his first appearance for Real's first team, playing 11 minutes in place of Ángel Di María in a 6–1 La Liga home rout of Deportivo de La Coruña. He added 32 games and three goals for the B side, which eventually fell short in the promotion playoffs.

On 7 July 2011, Juan Carlos signed with fellow top-flight club Real Zaragoza from third-party owner Quality Sports Investments, via S.C. Braga. On 22 September, he came on as a second-half substitute in an away fixture against Real Betis with the score at 4–1 for the hosts, and scored two goals in two minutes which eventually amounted to nothing, as the Aragonese lost 4–3.

Juan Carlos was subsequently loaned to Betis, Granada CF and Málaga CF, all in the top division. On 19 July 2017, he joined the latter side on a permanent four-year contract.

During his spell at the La Rosaleda Stadium, Juan Carlos was often hindered by injury problems. On 9 September 2020, the 30-year-old signed a two-year deal with Greek club Panathinaikos F.C. for an undisclosed fee.

Career statistics

Honours
Panathinaikos
Greek Football Cup: 2021–22

Individual
Super League Greece Team of the Year: 2021–22

References

External links

1990 births
Living people
Spanish footballers
Footballers from Madrid
Association football defenders
Association football wingers
Association football utility players
La Liga players
Segunda División players
Segunda División B players
Real Madrid Castilla footballers
Real Madrid CF players
Real Zaragoza players
Real Betis players
Granada CF footballers
Málaga CF players
S.C. Braga players
Super League Greece players
Panathinaikos F.C. players
Spain under-21 international footballers
Spanish expatriate footballers
Expatriate footballers in Greece
Spanish expatriate sportspeople in Greece